Arthur Rajotte (November 4, 1891 – September 29, 1950) was a Canadian provincial politician.

Born in Lewiston, Maine, Rajotte was mayor of Drummondville from 1938 to 1942. He was the member of the Legislative Assembly of Quebec for Drummond from 1935 to 1936 and from 1939 to 1944.

References

1891 births
1950 deaths
Mayors of places in Quebec
People from Drummondville
Politicians from Lewiston, Maine
Quebec Liberal Party MNAs
American emigrants to Canada
20th-century Canadian politicians